The COVID-19 vaccination program in Peru is the national vaccination strategy to protect the population against SARS-CoV-2 employing vaccines developed for the COVID-19 pandemic in Peru. Vaccination began on 9 February 2021, after three days of arrival of first vaccines. On a nation message, the head of state Francisco Sagasti confirmed the purchase of 38 millions of vaccines, being one million of vaccines for health personnel.

Timeline

Arrival of the first vaccines 

On 7 February 2021 at 19:54 h (UTC−5), 300,000 vaccines lot of Sinopharm coming from China arrived at the airport Jorge Chávez. This event was overseen by the president, Francisco Sagasti. Shortly after, the head of state reported that on 14 February a remaining lot 700,000 vaccines will also arrive to the country. On 8 February 2021, a thousand police officers were reported to guard the warehouse of National Center for the Supply of Strategic Health Resources (CENARES, acronym in Spanish).

Vaccine distribution 

According to the Government of Peru, the vaccination is predicted in three phases.

Public opinion 
According to the study presented by IPSOS, a French sociological and market research company, the acceptance of the vaccine in the Peruvian population was below 50% until January 2021 due to an environment of mistrust in the management of the Vaccination and management of the pandemic during the government of Martín Vizcarra and Francisco Sagasti. As of February 2021, the period that begins the vaccination process, the study revealed a slow and steady increase in the acceptance of the COVID-19 vaccine.

Note: (*) It was asked how "If right now a vaccine approved by the Ministry of Health and free to prevent the COVID-19, do you? would you be vaccinated or not vaccinated?
Note 2: (**) He wondered how "If tomorrow it's your turn for the COVID-19 vaccine, would you or would you not get the vaccine?"

Vaccines on order

Vaccines in trial stage

Statistics

By department

Progress of the vaccination campaign

Demographics

Graphs

Departments by type of vaccines 
 Last updated: September 15, 2021.

Data source: Platform of "Datos abiertos", Government of Peru.

Inoculated doses in provinces 
 Last updated: September 15, 2021.
Percentage of population (2020) with second dose in most populated provinces of the country.

Note: Name of provinces and department name in parentheses. Chiclayo (Lambayeque), Coronel Portillo (Ucayali), Huancayo (Junin), Lima (Lima province), Maynas (Loreto), Santa (Ancash) and Trujillo (La Libertad)
Data source: Platform of "Datos abiertos", Government of Peru.

Districts of Lima with the most vaccinations 
 Last updated: September 15, 2021.
Districts of the city of Lima with the highest reception of people who were inoculated with the two doses with respect to the size of their population (est. 2020). The districts with the highest percentage vaccinate people who come from other districts and have large vaccination centers.

Data source: Platform of "Datos abiertos", Government of Peru.

Vaccine distribution 
 Last updated: September 15, 2021.

Data source: Platform of "Datos abiertos", Government of Peru.

Vaccination progress 
 Last updated: September 15, 2021.

Data source: Platform of "Datos abiertos", Government of Peru.

References 

Vaccination
Peru